Eupithecia gaumaria is a moth in the family Geometridae first described by William Warren in 1906. It is found in Brazil.

References

Moths described in 1906
gaumaria
Moths of South America